Syed Asghar Wajahat, popularly known as Asghar Wajahat (born 5 July 1946), is a Hindi scholar, fiction writer, novelist, playwright, an independent documentary filmmaker and a television scriptwriter, who is most known for his work, 'Saat Aasmaan' and his acclaimed play, 'Jis Lahore Nai Dekhya, O Jamyai Nai', based on the story of an old Punjabi Hindu woman who gets left behind in Lahore, after the Partition of India, and then refuses to leave.

He has published five collections of short stories, six collections of plays and street plays, and four novels.

Biography 
Syed Asghar Wajahat was born on 5 July 1946 in the city of Fatehpur, in Fatehpur district, Uttar Pradesh. He completed his MA (Hindi) in 1968, and his PhD in 1974, also from Aligarh Muslim University (AMU), later he did his Post Doctoral Research from Jawaharlal Nehru University (1981–83). And by 1960, while still studying at the Aligarh Muslim University, he had already started writing.

He joined Jamia Millia Islamia, New Delhi in 1971 as a Lecturer of Hindi, and later became a Professor and also the Head of the Department of Hindi in the university.

Asghar Wajahat, Professor of Hindi at Jamia Millia Islamia, New Delhi is a reputed Hindi writer also. He has published 20 books including five novels, six full-length plays, five collections of short stories, a travelogue, a collection of street plays and a book on literary criticism.

He has also written film scripts and conducted workshops on screen writing. He has been placed among the top ten Hindi writers according to a survey conducted by Outlook (Hindi) magazine in 2007.

His work has been translated to many Indian and foreign languages

A collection of his short stories in English entitled Lies: Half told has also been published. An Italian translation of his stories was published by Centro de Studio de documentation, Universitá degli Studio de Venezia, in 1987.

Apart from his fiction, Wajahat regularly writes for various newspapers and magazines. He was guest Editor of BBCHindi.com for three months in 2007. He has also been associated with reputed Hindi literary magazines like Hans and Vartaman Sahitya as guest editor for their special issues on ‘Indian Muslims: Present and Future’ and ‘Pravasi Sahity’.

Wajahat has also been involved in Hindi cinema as a scriptwriter since 1975. He is now working on a film script for filmmaker Rajkumar Santoshi. He himself has made few documentary films including a 20-minute on the development of Urdu Ghazal.

He has been honoured by several literary organisations for his contribution to Hindi literature. Katha (UK), a London-based organisation gave him the ‘Best novel of the year award’ in 2005 for his novel Kaisi Aagi Lagai.

Presently, he is Professor of Hindi, Jamia Millia Islamia. He was also the officiating director, A.J. Kidwai Mass Communication Research Centre at Jamia Millia Islamia, Delhi.

Plays 
His most noted Partition play, 'Jin Lahore Nai Dekhya', was first performed under the direction of Habib Tanvir in 1989, who subsequently took the play to Karachi, Lahore, Sydney, New York and Dubai. The play has also been performed in several regional languages, a version of it has also been directed by theatre director Dinesh Thakur, Abhijeet Choudhary from Swatantra Theatre, Pune and now veteran Bollywood director Rajkumar Santoshi plans to make a film on it. Asgar Wajahat will be awarded the 31st Vyas Samman for his play Mahabali, which was published in 2019.

Bibliography 
 Lies: Half Told; translated by Rakshanda Jalil; 2002, Srishti Publishers. .
 Kaisi Aagi Lagai (Novel)
 Andhere se, collection of short stories with Pankaj Bisht, Bhasha Publication, New Delhi.
 Hindi Kahani, Punarmulyankan (criticism), co-editor, Bhasha Publication, New Delhi.
 Dilla Pahuncna hai, collection of short stories, Prakashan Sansthan, Delhi.
 Nioeant ke Sahyatra, translation of Qurratul-ain-Haider's Urdu Novel, Joanpah, Delhi.
 Hindi Urdu ka pragatioeal kavita, criticism, McMillan, Delhi.
 Firangi Laut Aaye (Play),
 Inna ka avaz (Play), Prakasan Sansthan, Delhi
 Veergati (play), Vaya Prakashan, Delhi.
 Aki (Play), Granth Ketan, 1/11244-C, Nikat Kirti Mandir, Subhash Park, Naveen Shahdra, delhi
 Nazeer Akbarabadi, translation of criticism by Prof. Mohd. Hasan, Sahitya Akademi, Delhi.
 Swimming pool collection of short stories, Rajkamal, Delhi.
 Bund Bund script of TV series, Radha Kasya, Delhi.
 Sab se sasta gosht, collection of street plays, Gagan Bharta, Delhi.
 Pak napak (play), Prem Prakashan Mandir
 Jin Lahore Nai Vekhya O Jamya e nai (play), Dinman Prakashan, Delhi.
 Sab kaha kuch, collection of short stories, Kitab Ghar, New Delhi.
 Sat asman (Novel), Rajkamal Prakashan, Delhi.
 Kaisi Aagi lagaee (Novel), Rajkamal, New Delhi
 Chalte to achcha tha, (Travelogue), Rajkamal, New Delhi
 Barkha Rachaee, (Novel) Rajkamal, New Delhi
 Man mati, (Nvel), Rajkamal, New Delhi
 Patkath lekhan-vyanharik nirdeshika, Rajkamal, New Delhi
 Raste ki talash me, (Travelogue) Antika, New Delhi

References

External links 
 Rajdhani, an excerpt from Novel Kaisi Aag Lagaai by Asghar Wajahat
 The spirits of Shah Alam Camp, A short story by Asghar Wajahat
 An article by Asghar Wajahat
 Baqar ganj ke Syed by Asghar Wajahat

Scholars from Uttar Pradesh
Indian male dramatists and playwrights
Hindi-language writers
1946 births
Living people
People from Fatehpur, Uttar Pradesh
Aligarh Muslim University alumni
Jawaharlal Nehru University alumni
Academic staff of Jamia Millia Islamia
20th-century Indian dramatists and playwrights
Hindi dramatists and playwrights
20th-century Indian novelists
Novelists from Uttar Pradesh
Dramatists and playwrights from Uttar Pradesh
20th-century Indian male writers
Recipients of the Sangeet Natak Akademi Award